Habitus may refer to:

 Habitus (biology), a term commonly used in biology as being less ambiguous than "habit"
 Habitus (sociology), embodied dispositions or tendencies that organize how people perceive and respond to the world around them
 Habitus: A Diaspora Journal
 Habitus, a 1998 novel by James Flint

See also
 Habit (biology)